Lawrence Roeck is a Canadian director, screenwriter and film producer known for Diablo and The Forger.

Early life and career 
At a very young age, his family moved from Calgary to California. His filmmaking career began in Alberta during the early 1990s by shooting videos with friends just out of high school. While in California, he worked as a video journalist for FOX and CBS News.

In 2015, Roeck won Best Feature at the San Diego Film Festival for his second feature film, Diablo, starring Scott Eastwood, Walton Goggins and Danny Glover. He had previously worked with Eastwood on his first feature, The Forger alongside Lauren Bacall, Josh Hutcherson, and Hayden Panettiere.

Carmel the Movie 
On February 27, 2009, Roeck faced legal action after investors sued him for $1.17 million. The suit was filed at the Los Angeles County Superior Court stating that he was paid a salary and made use of company assets without their consent.

References

External links 
 
 Official Site

Living people
Film producers from Alberta
Canadian male screenwriters
Year of birth missing (living people)